The All-Ireland Senior Hurling Championship 1896 was the tenth series of the All-Ireland Senior Hurling Championship, Ireland's premier hurling knock-out competition. Tipperary won the championship, beating Dublin 8–14 to 0–4 in the final.

Rule change

At the Gaelic Athletic Association's (GAA) annual congress it was decided to change the value of a goal. From 1892 until 1896 a goal was worth five points; however, the new change resulted in a goal being worth three points.

Format

All-Ireland Championship

Final: (1 match) The two provincial representatives made up the two final teams with the winners being declared All-Ireland champions.

Results

Leinster Senior Hurling Championship

An objection was made and a replay ordered.

Munster Senior Hurling Championship

All-Ireland Senior Hurling Championship

Championship statistics

Miscellaneous

 The Munster final ended in a draw for the first time ever. A replay was played for the 1891 Munster final; however, this was due to an objection rather than a draw.
 The Leinster final went to a replay as Kilkenny launched an objection against Dublin.
 Tipperary became the second team to win back-to-back All-Ireland titles following their final victory over Dublin. Mikey Maher became the first person to captain two All-Ireland-winning teams.

References

Sources

 Corry, Eoghan, The GAA Book of Lists (Hodder Headline Ireland, 2005).
 Donegan, Des, The Complete Handbook of Gaelic Games (DBA Publications Limited, 2005).

1896